Syed Ghazi Gulab Jamal (born 2 February 1954) is a Pakistani politician who had been a member of the National Assembly of Pakistan, from 2002 to 2007 and again from June 2013 to May 2018.

Early life

He was born on 2 February 1954.

Political career

He was elected to the National Assembly of Pakistan as an independent candidate from Constituency NA-39 (Tribal Area-IV) in 2002 Pakistani general election. He received 11,186 votes and defeated an independent candidate, Mian Hussain Jalali.

He ran for the seat of the National Assembly as an independent candidate from Constituency NA-39 (Tribal Area-IV) in 2008 Pakistani general election but was unsuccessful. He secured only 83 votes and lost the seat to an independent candidate, Jawad Hussain.

He was re-elected to the National Assembly as an independent candidate from Constituency NA-39 (Tribal Area-IV) in 2013 Pakistani general election. He received 7,922 votes and defeated Jawad Hussain, a candidate of Pakistan Peoples Party.

References

Living people
Pashtun people
Pakistani MNAs 2013–2018
People from Khyber Pakhtunkhwa
1954 births
Pakistani MNAs 2002–2007